The Vietnamese orangutan (Pongo hooijeri) is an extinct species of orangutan from the Pleistocene of Vietnam.  It was named in honor of paleontologist Dirk Albert Hooijer. Fossils of the ape were found in the Tham Hai Cave. It is unclear whether Pongo hooijeri is truly a distinct species or merely a Vietnamese population of one of the extant orangutan species.

Paleoecology 
The Vietnamese orangutan likely resembled modern orangutans found on the island of Sumatra in appearance, habitat preference and behavior with a possible physical resemblance to the Tapanuli orangutans of northern Sumatra. Orangutans favor lowland dipterocarp forests and old secondary forests with population densities at their greatest near sources of fresh water. Despite being adapted to an arboreal existence, modern orangutans show tolerance of grasslands and forest clearings to a small degree. This habitat tolerance likely bore resemblance to mainland orangutans during the Pleistocene. It is important to note the climate conditions of the Pleistocene are characterized by cooler, drier conditions that would have likely reduced the area of dense forest available to the Vietnamese orangutan and other rainforest inhabitants.

The mainland orangutan appears to have been sympatric to numerous species that are found in Southeast Asia today or were present in the region during the Holocene epoch as conditions within the region are similar to today and therefore would have supported a similar biologically rich ecosystem that existed in the region in the pre-industrial and pre-colonial era. Orangutans of mainland Southeast Asia may have shared their forests with the now extinct giant tapir along with northern hairy rhinoceros, Javan rhinoceros, gaur, Asian elephant along with representatives of Cervus and Sus. Orangutans of Vietnam and other regions of mainland Asia would have likely lived alongside a vast array of primates including various ancestral langurs, Rhinopithecus and lesser apes. Although it is unknown whether orangutans within the region preyed upon prosimians, lorises have been present in the fossil records of South East Asia since the Miocene and would have likely encountered the great apes.

Orangutans are invulnerable to most arboreal predators due to their large size and strength. However, if Vietnamese orangutans traveled across the forest floor similar to modern Bornean orangutans, they would have become possible prey for the ancestors of Indochinese leopards, tigers and packs of dholes. Both the sun bear and Asiatic black bear may have been potential threats to young, infirm or weakened individuals. Orangutans near large, continuous bodies of water would be vulnerable to saltwater and Siamese crocodiles as well as reticulated pythons. Fossil and subfossil evidence from human "trash piles" suggests orangutans were targeted by human hunter-gatherers as well.

References

Pleistocene primates
Prehistoric apes
Fossil taxa described in 1995
Prehistoric Vietnam
Pleistocene mammals of Asia